2014 World Hot Air Balloon Championships was 21st edition of World Hot Air Ballooning Championships held in Rio Claro, São Paulo, Brazil from July 17 to July 27, 2014. It was a first time when championships were held in South America. Total of 23 tasks were held.

Final ranking 

Top 20

References

External links 
 FAI profile
 

2014 in air sports
2014 in Brazilian sport
Ballooning competitions